Bloom's restaurant was a kosher Jewish deli restaurant in London. Until its last branch closed in summer 2010, it was the longest-standing kosher restaurant in England, and was well-known beyond the Jewish community. Blooms was under the supervision of the London Beth Din.

History
The original restaurant, in Brick Lane, London, was established by the eponymous Morris Bloom in 1920. Morris Bloom was a Lithuanian immigrant. His son Sidney continued to run the family business, and in the early 1930s, the restaurant moved to Old Montague Street. In 1952, the restaurant moved to Whitechapel High Street, and subsequently, a second restaurant was opened in Golders Green. The East End restaurant closed in 1996, due to the changing nature of the neighborhood.

For many years the Bloom's brand was maintained by the surviving restaurant in Golders Green in north west London. It was renovated in summer 2007, and served traditional Ashkenazi-style Jewish cuisine (as opposed to many other Kosher restaurants in London which are more influenced by Israeli-style food).

A new Bloom's restaurant opened in Edgware in 2007, but has now closed. Shortly thereafter, the final Bloom's outlet, the Golders Green restaurant, also closed its doors, in summer 2010.

See also
 List of delicatessens
 List of kosher restaurants
 List of restaurants in London

References

1920 establishments in England
Ashkenazi Jewish cuisine
Ashkenazi Jewish culture in London
Defunct restaurants in London
Fleischig restaurants
History of the London Borough of Tower Hamlets
Defunct Jewish delicatessens
Lithuanian-Jewish diaspora
Restaurants established in 1920
Restaurants in London
Restaurants disestablished in 2010
Jewish delicatessens in the United Kingdom